Barry Berkus (November 25, 1935 – November 30, 2012) was an American architect, author and art collector. He designed more than 600,000 houses. He also helped write building codes and develop new towns in Japan.

Early life
Berkus was born on November 25, 1935 in Los Angeles, California. He was educated at the John Muir High School in Pasadena. He went to college at the University of California, Santa Barbara and graduated from the School of Architecture at the University of Southern California.

Career
Berkus established an architectural firm in Santa Barbara in the 1970s. He eventually "employed more than 200 architects", with offices in San Francisco, New York, Chicago, Washington, Atlanta, Miami, Tokyo, and Kuala Lumpur.

Berkus was primarily an "architect of mass market housing." His work included "resort and master-planned communities, urban infill, commercial and institutional projects, and custom homes." He founded two design firms, B3 Architects and Berkus Design Studio, both based in Santa Barbara, with office across the nation and world.

Berkus got his start in 1956 as an intern for the late William F. Cody, a prominent Palm Springs architect. Under Cody’s tutelage, he assimilated the principles of Modernism. Later on, after starting his own practice, Berkus put his unique signature on virtually every type of new-home design.

A pivotal project for Berkus was Park Imperial South in Palm Springs, Calif. During a celebration of the community’s 50th anniversary in February 2011, Berkus remarked, “[Park Imperial South] opened up a way of looking at living space that still informs my designs. It inspired a preference for light, flexible room definitions, and a fluid connection with the outdoors.”

Berkus was recognized numerous times over the years for his contributions to the home-building industry and residential design. He won hundreds of design and planning awards during his career. The editors of Professional Builder named him the most innovative architect in U.S. housing and one of the most influential people in home building in the past 75 years.
"Upon graduation from the University of Miami School of Architecture, I had the opportunity to open an office for Barry in Miami. These are the years that I have always referred to as the ‘University of Berkus Graduate School.’ No one could have served as a better mentor and friend to me. He was always just a phone call away. His insights into the industry have saved me numerous times over; I am still in business because of the advice he has given me over the years. I will never measure up to the creative force and business acumen of Barry Berkus, but he set the bar for which we all strive. The world has lost an amazing architect, a great creative mind, a true friend, an insightful mentor, and a remarkable human being. I am so very blessed and thankful that our paths crossed so many years ago. He will be greatly missed," said architect Don Evans, The Evans Group, Orlando.

"Barry’s fame and accomplishments as architect/planner, good citizen, and Renaissance man are well catalogued and the accolades are well deserved. Yet what many will point to is his enthusiasm for making things better, and his gift for inspiration. He made us feel like the special, talented ones, the ones who would do great things. He was an exceptional mentor and true friend, and we will carry that spirit forward. Barry would like that," said Rebecca Hardin, president of Open Line Public Relations, Santa Barbara, who worked for Berkus for five years.
 Over the course of his career, he designed over 600,000 houses. Outside the United States, Berkus was involved in the urban planning of residential areas in Malaysia and housing structures in Disneyland Paris. He also redeveloped the waterfront in Vancouver, Canada. In Japan, he helped write new building codes and develop new towns. Berkus authored several books about architecture.

Berkus was also an art collector. He collected art by David Hockney, Roy Lichtenstein, Robert Rauschenberg, James Rosenquist, Frank Stella, and Andy Warhol.

Personal life and death
Berkus was married twice. He was married to Gail Hanks, from 1957 to 2000. He was very much in love with Gail until he lost her from illness. Berkus then met Jo Cahow and immediately fell in love. He withheld guilt for his first love, but he worked through the pain and loss with Jo. Once he learned it was okay to love again, he married Jo in mountains in Santa Barbara. They were together from 2005 until his death. He had two sons, Jeffrey and Steven, and a daughter, Carey. His kindness, loving nature, and generosity were only a couple of the many qualities mentioned by his loved ones.

Berkus died on November 30, 2012 in Santa Barbara, California, at age 77.

Selected works

References

1935 births
2012 deaths
John Muir High School alumni
Architects from Los Angeles
People from Santa Barbara, California
University of California, Santa Barbara alumni
USC School of Architecture alumni
American architecture writers
American art collectors